Kfarhazir     is a village in the Koura District of Lebanon. It is 350 meters above sea level, and has an area of  - the largest town in Koura by size, with a population of about 60000. The population are Greek Orthodox and Maronite.

Location and Geography
Kfarhazir lies on a strategic hill in Koura, overlooking the Koura fields and towns from the east, and the Mediterranean sea from the west. 
Kfarhazir is Five minutes away from the sea, 35 minutes away from the mountains, and 55 minutes away from Beirut.

Churches

There are 5 Christian Churches in Kfarhazir:

Church of  Saint Jacob(Eastern Orthodox)
Church of Saint James (Eastern Orthodox)
Church of Al Sayydeh (Eastern Orthodox)
Church of Saints Theodoros and George (Eastern Orthodox)
Church of Saint Elias (Eastern Orthodox)
Church of Saint Takla (Maronite Catholic)

References

See also
List of cities in Lebanon
Eastern Orthodox Christianity in Lebanon
University of Balamand

Eastern Orthodox Christian communities in Lebanon
Maronite Christian communities in Lebanon
Populated places in the North Governorate
Koura District
Amarna letters locations
Hellenistic colonies
Phoenician cities
Coloniae (Roman)